House of GVSB is the fourth studio album by American post-hardcore band Girls Against Boys, released in 1996 by Touch and Go Records.

Recording 
House of GVSB was recorded in September 1995 at Water Music studios in Hoboken, New Jersey, United States.

Reception 

House of GVSB has been generally well received by critics. It is the band's bestselling album, with over 70,000 copies having been sold worldwide by May 1998.

Ned Raggett of AllMusic wrote, "House of GVSB saw the band continuing its winning streak, and while arguably it contained no real surprises after the powerful one-two punch of Venus Luxure [No. 1 Baby] and Cruise Yourself, it still showed the quartet at the top of its considerable game."

Accolades

Track listing

Personnel 
Adapted from the House of GVSB liner notes.

 Girls Against Boys
 Alexis Fleisig – drums
 Eli Janney – keyboards, bass guitar, backing vocals, engineering, mixing
 Scott McCloud – lead vocals, guitar
 Johnny Temple – bass guitar

Production and additional personnel
 Dom Barbera – additional mixing
 Greg Calbi – mastering
 Wayne Dorell – additional engineering
 Rich Lamb – additional engineering
 Ted Niceley – production
 Mike Rippe – engineering
 Ken Tondre – Roland TR-808

Release history

References

External links 
 

1996 albums
Girls Against Boys albums
Touch and Go Records albums
Albums produced by Ted Niceley